Lahore Waste Management Company (LWMC) is an organization in Lahore.

History
The City District Government Lahore (CDGL) established Lahore Waste Management Company under section 42 of the companies ordinance 1984 on 19 March 2010. LWMC is governed by a Board of Directors (BOD), headed by a Chairman.
After the establishment of the company, a Services and Assets Management Agreement (SAAMA) between CDGL and LWMC, all the functions and assets of SWM department (CDGL) and TMAs have been entrusted to LWMC. LWMC aims to develop an integrated system of solid waste management to ensure efficient collection, transportation, recovery, treatment and disposal of waste generated in Lahore. In order to enhance the efficiency of LWMC, experienced professionals of different disciplines have been hired in the company.

Allegations of harsh working conditions for employees 

Hundreds of sanitary workers accused the company's management of imposing harsh working conditions. These include deducting from wages for leaves taken and breaks taken for meals, overtime work and holiday work without payment and considering late attendance as not reporting to work. The company have also introduced a new attendance system where attendance of the sanitary workers are marked by photographing them. Photographs were also taken end of the day to sign off the workers. The photographs are often taken in public forcing the workers to pose for the camera, a practice that is especially opposed by female workers, using Android devices.

The management have rejected the allegations of the workers who demonstrated against the company on May 15, 2014 calling that they are "uneducated" and "hoodlums and riffraff."

References

External links 
 LWMC's official website
 Waste management: Turkish companies to help clean Lahore, Express Tribune

Companies based in Lahore
Waste management companies of Pakistan
Pakistani companies established in 2010